August Hagenbach (22 December 1871 – 11 August 1955) was a Swiss physicist working in spectroscopy.

He was the son of physicist Eduard Hagenbach-Bischoff and obtained his Ph.D. in 1894 at the University of Leipzig with a thesis titled "" under the supervision of Gustav Heinrich Wiedemann.

In 1906 he took over the chaired professorship at the University of Basel earlier held by his father.

In 1926 he was rector of the University of Basel.

One of his students was Ernst Stueckelberg.

References

External links
 
 Brief 'genealogical' information on August Hagenbach
 
Historisches Lexikon der Schweiz

1871 births
1955 deaths
Swiss physicists
Spectroscopists